List of National Historic Landmarks in Washington may refer to:

 List of National Historic Landmarks in Washington (state)
 List of National Historic Landmarks in Washington, D.C.